Ulva acanthophora is a species of benthic subtropical seaweed in the Ulvaceae family that can be found in California and Mexico.

References

Ulvaceae
Plants described in 2003
Flora of North America